In organic chemistry, a cyanohydrin or hydroxynitrile is a functional group found in organic compounds in which a cyano and a hydroxy group are attached to the same carbon atom. Cyanohydrins are industrially important precursors to carboxylic acids and some amino acids. Cyanohydrins can be formed by the  cyanohydrin reaction, which involves treating a ketone or an aldehyde with hydrogen cyanide (HCN) in the presence of excess amounts of sodium cyanide (NaCN) as a catalyst:

In this reaction, the nucleophilic  ion attacks the electrophilic carbonyl carbon in the ketone, followed by protonation by HCN, thereby regenerating the cyanide anion.  Cyanohydrins are also prepared by displacement of sulfite by cyanide salts:

Cyanohydrins are intermediates in the Strecker amino acid synthesis.  In aqueous acid, they are hydrolyzed to the α-hydroxy acid.

Acetone cyanohydrins
Acetone cyanohydrin, (CH3)2C(OH)CN is the cyanohydrin of acetone.  It is generated as an intermediate in the industrial production of methyl methacrylate.  In the laboratory, this liquid serves as a source of HCN, which is inconveniently volatile.  Thus, acetone cyanohydrin can be used for the preparation of other cyanohydrins, for the transformation of HCN to  Michael acceptors, and for the formylation of arenes.  Treatment of this cyanohydrin with lithium hydride affords anhydrous lithium cyanide:

Preparative methods
Cyanohydrins were first prepared by the addition of HCN and a catalyst (base or enzyme) to the corresponding carbonyl. On a laboratory scale the use of HCN (toxic) is largely not encouraged, for this reason other less dangerous cyanation reagents are sought out. In situ formation of HCN can be sourced using precursors such as acetone cyanohydrin. Alternatively, cyano-silyl derivatives such as TMS-CN allows for both the cyanation and protection in one step without the need for HCN. Similar procedures relying on ester, phosphate and carbonate formation have been reported.

Other cyanohydrins
Mandelonitrile, with the formula C6H5CH(OH)CN, occurs in small amounts in the pits of some fruits. Related cyanogenic glycosides are known, such as amygdalin.

Glycolonitrile, also called hydroxyacetonitrile or formaldehyde cyanohydrin, is the organic compound with the formula HOCH2CN.  It is the simplest cyanohydrin, being derived from formaldehyde.

See also
 Halohydrin

References

External links
IUPACs Gold Book definition of cyanohydrins 

Functional groups